The 2010-11 season of the Tonga Major League was the 32nd season of top flight association football competition in Tonga. Lotohaʻapai United won the championship for the twelfth time.

Standings
Based on known results:

Knockout Phase

Semifinals

Third-place match

Final

References

Tonga Major League seasons
Tonga
Football
Tonga
Football